(born 20 January 1957) is a Japanese fencer. He competed in the individual and team foil events at the 1984 and 1988 Summer Olympics.

References

External links
 

1957 births
Living people
Japanese male foil fencers
Olympic fencers of Japan
Fencers at the 1984 Summer Olympics
Fencers at the 1988 Summer Olympics
Asian Games medalists in fencing
Fencers at the 1978 Asian Games
Fencers at the 1986 Asian Games
Asian Games bronze medalists for Japan
Medalists at the 1978 Asian Games
Medalists at the 1986 Asian Games
20th-century Japanese people
21st-century Japanese people